

M05B Drugs affecting bone structure and mineralization

M05BA Bisphosphonates
M05BA01 Etidronic acid
M05BA02 Clodronic acid
M05BA03 Pamidronic acid
M05BA04 Alendronic acid
M05BA05 Tiludronic acid
M05BA06 Ibandronic acid
M05BA07 Risedronic acid
M05BA08 Zoledronic acid

M05BB Bisphosphonates, combinations
M05BB01 Etidronic acid and calcium, sequential
M05BB02 Risedronic acid and calcium, sequential
M05BB03 Alendronic acid and colecalciferol
M05BB04 Risedronic acid, calcium and colecalciferol, sequential
M05BB05 Alendronic acid, calcium and colecalciferol, sequential
M05BB06 Alendronic acid and alfacalcidol, sequential
M05BB07 Risedronic acid and colecalciferol
M05BB08 Zoledronic acid, calcium and colecalciferol, sequential
M05BB09 Ibandronic acid and colecalciferol

M05BC Bone morphogenetic proteins
M05BC01 Dibotermin alfa
M05BC02 Eptotermin alfa

M05BX Other drugs affecting bone structure and mineralization
M05BX01 Ipriflavone
M05BX02 Aluminium chlorohydrate
M05BX03 Strontium ranelate
M05BX04 Denosumab
M05BX05 Burosumab
M05BX06 Romosozumab
M05BX07 Vosoritide
M05BX08 Menatetrenone
M05BX53 Strontium ranelate and colecalciferol

References

M05